Timothy John Nielsen (born 5 May 1968) is a former South Australia state cricketer and formerly the head coach of the Australian cricket team. Nielsen played 101 first-class matches for his state between 1990–91 and 1998–99.

Nielsen was confirmed as John Buchanan's replacement as the coach of Australia on 5 February 2007. Nielsen, who became the hot favourite when Tom Moody withdrew from contention, took over the role after the 2007 Cricket World Cup.

Like Buchanan, Nielsen played first-class cricket in Australia but never reached international level. He played the last of his 101 games a wicketkeeper-batsman for South Australia in 1999 before he moved into coaching, first with the Redbacks and then as an assistant to Buchanan with the national team.

Nielsen was the head coach at the Commonwealth Bank Centre for Excellence in Brisbane, where he worked with a number of the new crop of players looking to make their way into the Australia team.

His contract was due to run until the end of Australia's 2009 Ashes defence but was extended for a further two years in December 2008 to extend it until after the 2011 World Cup. However, he retired on 20 September 2011, immediately after Australia's tour of Sri Lanka.

References

External links

1968 births
Living people
People from Forest Gate
South Australia cricketers
Australian cricketers
Australian cricket coaches
Coaches of the Australia national cricket team
Caribbean Premier League coaches
English emigrants to Australia
Wicket-keepers